Ofu County is a county in the Manu'a District in American Samoa. It was the result of the subdivision of the prior Luanuu County in two, with the other newly created county being Olosega, first reported on the 1930 U.S. Census. It is now contiguous with its only village, Ofu.

Demographics

Ofu County was first recorded beginning with the 1930 U.S. Census. It had previously been within Luanuu County. Its population zenith was in 1960, with 605 residents. It has since experienced a dramatic population decline (as has the Manu'u District), losing over 2/3rds of its population as of 2010.

Villages
Alaufau (now defunct and within Ofu)
Ofu

References 

Populated places in American Samoa